Mama Cass Restaurants is one of the food based companies in Nigeria.

History
In November 1983,  Charis Grace Onabowale  opened the first location at Allen Avenue, Ikeja, Lagos State.
The first outlet carried for the first time the brand “Mama Cass Cafeteria”. Mama Cass Restaurants currently owns a chain of about 14 quick service restaurants and has expanded its service locations to other parts of the country. Besides Lagos, other outlets are located in other Nigerian states including Ogun, Edo, FCT, and also in the United Kingdom.
Mama Cass specializes in home cooked traditional African meals and international cuisines and other specialties like Oven Fresh pastries, Jaydens Sliced Bread. In addition to the restaurant chain, a bakery and Industrial catering  also operates.  It has expanded into industrial canteen management, private function catering and high volume bread production.

See also
Timeline of Lagos
List of restaurants in Lagos

References

External links 
  Mama Cass United Kingdom

Restaurants in Lagos
Restaurant chains in Nigeria
Restaurants established in 1983
1983 establishments in Nigeria
Multinational companies based in Lagos
Multinational food companies